Kerensia Morrison is a Jamaican Labour Party politician who has been Member of Parliament for Saint Catherine North Eastern since 2020.

She sat in the Senate of Jamaica from 2016 to 2020.

References 

Living people

Year of birth missing (living people)
Members of the Senate of Jamaica

Members of the House of Representatives of Jamaica
21st-century Jamaican women politicians
21st-century Jamaican politicians
Jamaica Labour Party politicians
People from Saint Catherine Parish
Members of the 14th Parliament of Jamaica